Astragalus desperatus (common name - rimrock milkweed) is a  perennial plant in the legume family (Fabaceae) found in the Colorado Plateau and Canyonlands region of the southwestern United States.

Description

Growth pattern

Leaves and stems

Inflorescence and fruit
It blooms from March to August.

Habitat and range
It grows only on the Colorado Plateau (endemic) in mixed desert shrub and pinyon-juniper forest communities.

References

desperatus
Flora of the Northwestern United States
Flora without expected TNC conservation status